Bloodgood Haviland Cutter (1817–1906), popularly known as the "Long Island Farmer Poet," was a prominent and colorful figure in late 19th century Long Island, New York.

Biography

Early life
Cutter was born August 5, 1817, the son of Mary Bloodgood Haviland and Richard Cutter. He was raised primarily by his stepfather's uncle, Roe Haviland (who Cutter referred to as "Grandfather Haviland"), and left school at sixteen to work on one of Roe's schooners, continuing his own education through reading the Bible.

In 1840 he eloped with Emeline Allen, a member of the well-propertied Allen family of Great Neck, NY. He later acquired the Allen mill, which thereafter was called Cutter's Mill (and after which Cutter Mill Road in Great Neck is named). His main occupation was farming, but Cutter was also a propertied landowner, eventually acquiring numerous parcels in Great Neck as well as large blocks of land north of the railroad station there, and across Manhasset Bay in what is now Plandome Heights, where he lived in a twenty-room home towards the end of his life. During the course of his business dealings he developed a reputation for honesty and sound business acumen.

Poetry

Cutter also developed a reputation as a "character" for his old-fashioned clothes, his country accent, and the poetry  that he wrote and distributed for various events. A stanza of a poem Cutter wrote for the second centennial anniversary of Glen Cove, Long Island reads:

In 1867 Cutter  booked passage for a five-month trip aboard the Quaker City. Mark Twain turned out to be one of the other passengers, and Cutter found himself immortalized in Twain's book Innocents Abroad as the character the "Poet Lariat." This is how Mark Twain described Cutter in his notes for the book:

In 1886 Cutter self-published a collection of his poems titled The Long Island Farmer's Poems, which included an autographed picture of Mark Twain as well as a mention of being Twain's Poet Lariat on the title page.

Death
Cutter died in 1906 at the age of 89. A tall granite gravestone marks his burial site in the cemetery of the Zion Episcopal Church in Douglaston, Queens, to which he had once made a sizable donation. His residuary estate, valued at nearly $500,000, was willed to the American Bible Society. His vast collection of books, antiques, art, travel mementoes and various other items (including "as hot a bunch of waistcoats as ever appeared on Broadway") was sold at auction.

Publications
"Poetical lecture, suggested after seeing the model of Solomon's temple." L.I. Times Office, 1860. 20 pages.
"Long Island farmer on congressmen." Little Neck, N.Y., 1860. 1 page.
"Long Island farmer, musing on a wheel-barrow, while waiting for his neighbor to turn out." Little Neck, N.Y., 1861. 1 page.
"Eulogy on General Scott." Little Neck, L.I., 1861. 8 pages.
"A poem on the New England kitchen." Little Neck, L.I., 1864. 8 pages.
"Long Island farmer to the memory of John A. Van Nostrand, known as "Jack," in Mark Twain's Innocents' abroad." Little Neck, N.Y., 1879. 1 page.
"Lines on the Egyptian obelisk 'Cleopatra's Needle.'" Flushing, N.Y., W. R. Burling, Printer, 1881. 8 pages.
"The Long Island farmer's poems: lines written on the "Quaker City" excursion to Palestine, and other poems." New York, N. Tibbals & sons (published for the author). 1886. 499 pages.
"Long Island farmer on the burning of his mill, on the morning of December, and its history." Little Neck, N.Y., 1889. 1 page.
"Poems." Berkeley, Calif. Hart Press, 1948. 1 page.

References

External links
Long Island Genealogy's page on Bloodgood Cutter 
The Douglaston/Little Neck Historical Society's page on Bloodgood Cutter 
Bloodgood Cutter's digitized poems in Brown University's Harris Broadsides collection.

1817 births
American real estate businesspeople
American male poets
1906 deaths
People from Great Neck, New York
People from North Hempstead, New York
19th-century American poets
19th-century American male writers
19th-century American businesspeople